George Reginald Powell (11 November 1924 – 19 February 1989) was an English footballer, who played for QPR as a right back.

Early life
Powell was born Fulham, London on 11 November 1924.

Career
Powell signed for Rangers in 1946 after turning down Arsenal and Fulham. He made his debut in a 2–3 defeat against Reading in November 1947. He was a member of the team that won the Third Division (South) Championship in 1948. 
In 1948 Sheffield United bid a British record £28,000 by Powell turned the move down to stay in London
The same year, 1948, he was captain of QPR when they won the 3rd Division title.
He was also Captain of the GB side in the war years.
He was the last amateur to play for Fulham first team prior to his signing for QPR
Powell played right-back and went on to play 155 league games for Rangers. Powell left Rangers for non-league football in 1953.

Later life
Married to Alice Powell (also known as Morrie) living in  Norwich
Father of George Alan Powell living in Norwich, who is a former Norfolk County FA manager / coach
He died in 1989.

References

1924 births
1989 deaths
Footballers from Fulham
Queens Park Rangers F.C. players
English footballers
Association football fullbacks
English Football League players